Discocheilus multilepis is a fish species in the genus Discocheilus from China.

References

External links 

Cyprinid fish of Asia
Fish described in 1994
Discocheilus